Tauno Suoniemi (4 December 1927 – 22 July 1985) was a Finnish weightlifter. He competed in the men's lightweight event at the 1952 Summer Olympics.

References

External links
 

1927 births
1985 deaths
Finnish male weightlifters
Olympic weightlifters of Finland
Weightlifters at the 1952 Summer Olympics
People from Nokia, Finland
Sportspeople from Pirkanmaa